Noble Rocks is a group of about 19 small, low rocks in Marguerite Bay, lying east of Jester Rock in the Dion Islands. The Dion Islands were first sighted and roughly charted in 1909 by the FrAE. Noble Rocks were surveyed in 1949 by the Falkland Islands Dependencies Survey (FIDS), and so named by the United Kingdom Antarctic Place-Names Committee (UK-APC) because of their association with Emperor Island.

Rock formations of Graham Land
Fallières Coast